José Pedro Biléu (born 10 April 1932, in Mora) is a former Portuguese footballer who played as forward.

Football career 

Biléu gained 2 caps for Portugal and made his debut 22 May 1955 in Porto against England, in a 3-1 win.

External links 
 
 

1932 births
Living people
Portuguese footballers
Association football forwards
Primeira Liga players
Portugal international footballers
Lusitano G.C. players
Sportspeople from Évora District